Calabar is a city in Nigeria.

Calabar may also refer to::

 Calabar angwantibo or Calabar potto, a primate
 Calabar bean
 Calabar python
 Calabar River, Nigeria
 Domingos Fernandes Calabar (c. 1600–1635) was a Brazilian soldier and smuggler

See also
 Calabar Kingdom (disambiguation)